is a Japanese actor, voice actor and narrator most famous for performing the role of Koji Kabuto in the 1972 series Mazinger Z and its sequels. He also voiced Tutty from Bosco Adventure and Ultraman Taro in recurring Ultra Series entries. He is also the official Japanese dub-over voice artist for Jackie Chan. He voiced Dracula in Castlevania: Rondo of Blood. He also voiced Lei Wulong from the Tekken fighting game series, who has a strong resemblance to Jackie Chan. He is also a fluent English Speaker.

Filmography

Television animation
Mazinger Z (1972) (Koji Kabuto)
Future Boy Conan (1978) (Orlo)
Space Battleship Yamato II (1978) (Cosmodart Nasca)
Starzinger (1978) (Jan Kugo)
Ashita no Joe 2 (1980) (Tiger Ozaki)
Dancouga – Super Beast Machine God (1985) (Professor Kotarō Hazuki)
Transformers: The Headmasters (1987) (Rodimus Convoy and Hot Rodimus)
Godannar (2003) (Tatsuya Aoi)
Kenichi: The Mightiest Disciple (2006) (Apachai Hopachai)
Gin Tama (2008) (Captain Dragon (ep. 109))
Ixion Saga DT (2012) (Father)
Tokyo Ravens (2013) (Daizen Amami)
One Piece (2021) (Kōzuki Oden)
Princess Principal (2017) (Beatrice (Imitation Voice (other by Fukushi Ochiai, Motomu Kiyokawa, Tessho Genda, Kōsei Hirota) "Telephone partner") (ep. 9))

Theatrical animation
Mazinger Z vs. Devilman (1973) (Kouji Kabuto)
Doraemon: Nobita and Fantastic Three Musketeers (1994) (Dragon)
Crayon Shin-chan: The Storm Called: Yakiniku Road of Honor (2003) (Man of sanitary gown)
Mazinger Z: Infinity (2018)

Video games
Castlevania: Rondo of Blood (1993) (Count Dracula)
Ehrgeiz: God Bless the Ring (1999) (Koji Masuda)
Final Fantasy IV (Nintendo DS version) (2007) (Edward "Edge" Geraldine)
Imagin Anime 3: You Will Find the Ul*ra Planet (2008) (Ultraman Taro)
Kung Fu Rider (2010) (Tobio)
Street Fighter X Tekken (2012) (Lei Wulong)
Dissidia Final Fantasy Opera Omnia (2017) (Edward "Edge" Geraldine)
Tekken series (Lei Wulong)

Original video animation (OVA)
Legend of the Galactic Heroes (1989) (Karl Robert Steinmetz)
Cyber City Oedo 808 (1990) (Shunsuke Sengoku)
Mazinkaiser (2001) (Kouji Kabuto)

Tokusatsu
Kamen Rider (1971) - (Shocker Scientist/Construction site worker/Prison guard) (actor) (4 episodes)
Ultraman Story (1984) (Ultraman Taro)
Ultraman Mebius (2006) (Ultraman Taro)
Juken Sentai Gekiranger (2007) (Sharkie Chan (eps. 17 - 49))
Ultraman Ginga (2013) (Ultraman Taro)
Ultraman Ginga S (2014) (Ultraman Taro/Strium Brace)
Ultraman Taiga (2019) (Ultraman Taro) (ep.1)

Live-action
Kamen Rider (1971) (Shocker Scientist (ep. 1))
Ultraman Leo (1975) (Professor Nakamoto (ep. 40)) -->

Dubbing roles

Live-action
Jackie Chan
Hand of Death (Tan Feng)
Killer Meteors (Immortal Meteor)
New Fist of Fury (Cheng Long / Sing Lung / Ah Lung / Dragon)
Shaolin Wooden Men (Little Mute)
To Kill with Intrigue (Hsiao Lei)
Drunken Master (Freddie Wong)
Half a Loaf of Kung Fu (Jiang)
Magnificent Bodyguards (Lord Ting Chung)
Snake & Crane Arts of Shaolin (Hsu Yin-Fung)
Spiritual Kung Fu (Yi-Lang)
Snake in the Eagle's Shadow (Chien Fu)
Dragon Fist (Tang How-yuen)
The Fearless Hyena (Shing Lung)
Master with Cracked Fingers (Lung / Jackie)
The Big Brawl (Jerry Kwan)
The Young Master (Dragon Lung)
Dragon Lord (Dragon Ho)
Fantasy Mission Force (Sammy)
Fearless Hyena Part II (Cheng Lung)
Project A (Sergeant Dragon Ma)
Winners and Sinners (CID 07 / Cop #7086)
Wheels on Meals (Thomas)
My Lucky Stars (Muscles)
Police Story (Sergeant "Kevin" Chan Ka-kui)
The Protector (Billy Wong)
Twinkle, Twinkle, Lucky Stars (Muscles)
Heart of Dragon (Ted / Tat Fung)
Armour of God (Jackie)
Project A Part II (Sergeant Dragon Ma)
Dragons Forever (Jackie Lung)
Police Story 2 (Sergeant "Kevin" Chan Ka-kui)
Miracles ('Charlie' Kuo Chen Wah)
Island of Fire (Da Chui)
Armour of God II: Operation Condor (Jackie)
Police Story 3: Super Cop (RHKP Inspector "Kevin" Chan Ka-kui)
Twin Dragons (Ma Yau / Bok Min)
The Legend of the Drunken Master (Wong Fei Hung)
Rumble in the Bronx (Ma Hon Keung)
Rush Hour (Detective Inspector Yang Naing Lee)
Shanghai Noon (Chon Wang)
Rush Hour 2 (Chief Inspector Lee)
The Tuxedo (James "Jimmy" Tong / Clark Devlin)
Rob-B-Hood (Thongs)
Rush Hour 3 (Chief Inspector Yan Naing Lee)
The Forbidden Kingdom (Lu Yan / Hop)
Shinjuku Incident (Steelhead / Nick)
Looking for Jackie (Jackie Chan)
The Spy Next Door (Bob Ho)
The Karate Kid (Mr. Han)
Police Story 2013 (Detective Zhong Wen)
Dragon Blade (Huo An)
Skiptrace (Bennie Chan)
Kung Fu Yoga (Jack)
Bleeding Steel (Lin Dong)
The Foreigner (Ngoc Minh Quan)
The Knight of Shadows: Between Yin and Yang (Pu Songling)
Viy 2: Journey to China (Master)
Vanguard (Tang Huanting)
The Amityville Horror (1982 NTV edition) (Jimmy (Marc Vahanian))
The Big Gundown (1979 TV Asahi edition) (Manuel "Cucillo" Sanchez (Tomas Milian))
Carrie (Principal Henry Morton (Barry Shabaka Henley))
Cloud Atlas (Captain Molyneux, Vyvyan Ayrs, Timothy Cavendish, Korean Musician, Prescient 2 (Jim Broadbent))
Dawn of the Dead (Roger "Trooper" DeMarco (Scott Reiniger))
Die Hard (1990 TV Asahi edition) (Harry Ellis (Hart Bochner))
Eaten Alive (Buck (Robert Englund))
F/X: The Series (Rollie Tyler (Cameron Daddo))
The Killer (Detective Li Ying (Danny Lee))
Night of the Living Dead (Sheriff McClelland (George Kosana))
Numb3rs (Larry Fleinhardt (Peter MacNicol))
The Rock (Major Tom Baxter (David Morse))
Texas, Adios (1989 TV Tokyo edition) (Jim Sullivan (Cole Kitosch))
Thunderbird 6 (Scott Tracy)
Thunderbirds Are Go (Scott Tracy)
Tourist Trap (Jerry (Jon Van Ness))
The Towering Inferno (1984 NTV edition) (Roger Simmons (Richard Chamberlain))
West Side Story (1979 TBS edition) (Big Deal (Anthony 'Scooter' Teague), Pepe (Jay Norman))

Animation

The Simpsons (1989-12-17†), Lionel Hutz (Phil Hartman)
Jackie Chan Adventures (?), Jackie Chan
Kung Fu Panda (?), Monkey
Kung Fu Panda 2 (?), Monkey
Kung Fu Panda 3 (?), Monkey
Police Academy: The Animated Series (?), Carey Mahoney
Secrets of the Furious Five (?), Young Monkey
Transformers Animated (?), Rodimus Minor

References

External links 
 Official agency profile 
 Hiroya Ishimaru at GamePlaza -Haruka- Voice Acting DataBase 
 
 

1941 births
Living people
Japanese male video game actors
Japanese male voice actors
Male voice actors from Sendai
Production Baobab voice actors
20th-century Japanese male actors
21st-century Japanese male actors